David Philippe Henri Ngog (born 1 April 1989), known as David N'Gog, is a French professional footballer who plays as a striker for Greek Gamma Ethniki club Panionios.

N'Gog started his career with French Ligue 1 club Paris Saint-Germain. He made his senior debut in 2006 and in 2008 won the Coupe de la Ligue. English Premier League club Liverpool signed him at the start of the 2008–09 season. After three years, he moved to fellow Premier League club Bolton Wanderers, but was relegated with them after just one season. Following spells in Greece, Scotland, Hungary, and Lithuania, N'Gog announced his retirement in 2020.

N'Gog is a former France under-21 international. However, he was also eligible to represent Cameroon, by way of his father, and was approached by Cameroon in the past to make the switch.

Early life
N'Gog was born in Gennevilliers, Hauts-de-Seine, to a Cameroonian father and a French mother. He is the cousin of former French international player Jean-Alain Boumsong.

Club career

Paris Saint-Germain
N'Gog started his career with Paris Saint-Germain of Ligue 1 in 2001. He signed his first professional contract in June 2006.

Liverpool

2008–09 season
Manager Rafael Benítez hailed his scouting network after his signing, saying that "They are finding players like N'Gog, players with quality who are not a high price". N'Gog played his first game for Liverpool in a friendly game against Villarreal on 30 July 2008 and scored his first goal one game later against Rangers in another pre-season friendly. He then followed this up by scoring Liverpool's final goal in their next pre-season friendly, a 4–1 win over Norwegian side Vålerenga. He made his Premier League debut against Aston Villa, coming on as a substitute for Fernando Torres. N'Gog scored his first goal for Liverpool in their 3–1 victory over PSV in the group stages of the UEFA Champions League. N'Gog made his first start for Liverpool on 7 February 2009 against Portsmouth, and scored his first league goal on 3 March 2009 against Sunderland in a 2–0 win at Anfield. N'Gog scored his second league goal for the club on 11 April 2009 against Blackburn Rovers at Anfield in an emphatic 4–0 win.

2009–10 season

N'Gog scored his first goal of the new season with the final goal in a 4–0 home win against Stoke City. This was his fourth career goal for Liverpool, three of which came in league matches. The following month, he then went on to score the winning goal in a third-round League Cup game, to win 1–0 away against Leeds United. On 25 October, in a crucial game against Manchester United, he came on for goalscorer Torres at Anfield, scoring a goal in the 96th minute in the 2–0 win to seal an important victory for Liverpool. After the crunch tie, N'Gog said scoring the goal was "a fantastic moment for me and the team and I would say it's my best moment in football." He scored his fourth goal of the season on 9 November against Birmingham City before winning a controversial penalty that gave Liverpool a draw after Steven Gerrard converted from the spot. N'Gog then scored Liverpool's only goal in their next match away to Debrecen in the Champions League. Benítez showed his faith in N'Gog by handing him a start against Everton in the Merseyside derby; this match finished 2–0 to Liverpool. He scored his fourth league goal (six in total of the 2009–10 season) in a 2–1 victory over Wigan Athletic. N'Gog's goal nine minutes from time eventually broke the resistance of a determined Unirea Urziceni at Anfield in the Europa League.

2010–11 season
On 29 July, N'Gog scored twice in Roy Hodgson's first competitive match as manager in Liverpool's Europa League third qualifying round first leg 2–0 win over Macedonian side Rabotnički. In the second leg of the tie played at Anfield, N'Gog scored the opening goal via a header and also won a penalty, which Gerrard scored, as Liverpool ran out 4–0 aggregate winners. 

N'Gog then scored again in Liverpool's opening match of the season at home to Arsenal in a 1–1 draw by turning past Thomas Vermaelen and rifling the ball into the top corner of the net past Arsenal goalkeeper Manuel Almunia.
He was enjoying the best start to a Liverpool season before he was taken out of the squad that played West Bromwich Albion for Torres. After being left out of the game against Birmingham City, N'Gog shot to fire again in the Europa League, scoring two in Liverpool's 4–1 victory over Steaua București. He scored an extra-time equaliser in the League Cup defeat to Northampton Town to take the tie to penalties, but missed his penalty in the shoot-out, and played the remaining 35 minutes in the Reds' frustrating 2–2 draw against Sunderland at Anfield. On 3 October, he replaced the injured Torres after just 10 minutes in their 2–1 home loss to Blackpool. On 24 October, he replaced Joe Cole in the 80th minute in Liverpool's 2–1 Premier League win at Anfield against Blackburn Rovers. He replaced Cole for the second time, in Liverpool's 1–0 Premier League win against Bolton Wanderers at the Reebok Stadium on 31 October. N'Gog was praised by Sam Allardyce for the way in which his introduction changed the game for Liverpool, indirectly leading to their late winner. He continued to be an impact sub from the bench, following the departure of Torres, and the signings of Luis Suárez and Andy Carroll and often finding himself in the starting line-up.

Bolton Wanderers
On 31 August 2011, for £4 million transfer fee, Liverpool announced that N'Gog had completed a move to Bolton Wanderers in a three-year deal. N'Gog made his first appearance for Bolton as a substitute for Kevin Davies in Bolton's 5–0 defeat to Manchester United at the Reebok Stadium on 10 September. His first goal for Bolton Wanderers came in Bolton's 3–1 win against Wigan Athletic at the DW Stadium on 15 October. Fulham made an unsuccessful £3 million bid for him in August 2012.

Swansea City
On 27 January 2014, N'Gog joined Premier League side Swansea City until the end of the season, signing for an undisclosed fee.
He made his debut for the club on 1 February 2014 as a substitute for Nathan Dyer in a 2–0 away defeat to West Ham United.

Reims
On 1 September 2014, N'Gog ended his six-year spell in the English leagues after signing a two-year contract with Ligue 1 outfit Reims.

Panionios
On 12 August 2016, Super League Greece club Panionios announced that they had signed N'Gog for an undisclosed fee.

Ross County
On 23 January 2018, N'Gog joined Ross County of the Scottish Premiership on a deal until the end of the 2017–18 season. The Frenchman reunited with Owen Coyle, who had managed him at Bolton Wanderers. He scored his first goal for the club in a 2–1 loss to Rangers on 28 January 2018.

Budapest Honvéd
In August 2018, N'Gog joined Hungarian club Budapest Honvéd. On 25 August, he scored seven minutes into his debut against Debrecen.

Žalgiris and early retirement
In February 2020 N'Gog became a member of Lithuanian A League side FK Žalgiris.

On 21 June 2020, Žalgiris announced that N'Gog had officially retired from professional football at the age of 31.

Return to Panionios
In October 2022, N'Gog returned to action, signing for Greek third tier club Panionios, returning to Greece after 5 years.

International career
In November 2009, N'Gog was approached to play for Cameroon, despite having already represented France at youth levels. The then Liverpool striker said: "I have had contact with the Cameroonian federation. Now I need some time to think about things. I'm very flattered." In February 2010, with Cameroon preparing for the 2010 World Cup, Cameroon's Minister of Sports, Michel Zoah, met with N'Gog's father on two occasions to try and convince the player to switch allegiances. A few months later, in May, N'Gog was not included in Cameroon's preliminary squad for the World Cup. When asked why, Cameroon coach Paul Le Guen said that N'Gog had insisted on a starting spot with the Indomitable Lions. However, N'Gog refuted the claims.

Career statistics

Honours
Paris Saint-Germain
Coupe de la Ligue: 2007–08

Žalgiris
Lithuanian Supercup: 2020

References

External links

1989 births
Living people
People from Gennevilliers
Footballers from Hauts-de-Seine
French footballers
France under-21 international footballers
Association football forwards
Paris Saint-Germain F.C. players
Liverpool F.C. players
Bolton Wanderers F.C. players
Swansea City A.F.C. players
Stade de Reims players
Panionios F.C. players
Ross County F.C. players
Budapest Honvéd FC players
FK Žalgiris players
Ligue 1 players
Premier League players
English Football League players
Super League Greece players
Scottish Professional Football League players
Nemzeti Bajnokság I players
A Lyga players
French expatriate footballers
Expatriate footballers in England
Expatriate footballers in Hungary
Expatriate footballers in Lithuania
Expatriate footballers in Scotland
Expatriate footballers in Wales
French expatriate sportspeople in England
French expatriate sportspeople in Hungary
French expatriate sportspeople in Lithuania
French expatriate sportspeople in Scotland
French expatriate sportspeople in Wales
French sportspeople of Cameroonian descent